Villavieja is a town and municipality in the Huila Department, Colombia. The municipality covers most of the Tatacoa Desert.  The town is built on the banks of the Magdalena River.

External links

Municipalities of Huila Department